The Cremino is a chocolate originally from Piedmont, in northern Italy, composed by three layers, the outer layers are made with gianduja chocolate, while the inner one can be made with coffee, lemon or hazelnut paste.  Its typical shape is a cube and it's wrapped with aluminium paper, with a band which indicates the flavour.

History 
This chocolate was created in the first half of the 19th century by Ferdinando Baratti, who owned with his associate Edoardo Milano a laboratory in Turin (the future ), where they produced liquors and sweets. However, the first official papers about the cremino are from 1934.

Nowadays, Italian producers of cremino include: Caffarel, Venchi, San Carlo and Pernigotti.

FIAT 
The Italian car manufacturer FIAT is linked to this chocolate because in 1911 they launched a contest for Italian chocolate makers to create a new chocolate, for publicising their new model . The contest was won by Majani from Bologna, the first Italian chocolate maker, born in 1796, who created a new cremino with 4 layers, instead of 3: dark ones with gianduja, while the other two with almond paste.

See also 
 Nanaimo bar

References 

Italian chocolate
Cuisine of Piedmont
Culture in Turin